Catiniidae is an extinct family of beetles in the order Coleoptera.

The family name Catiniidae Ponomarenko, 1968 is a junior homonym of Catiniidae Bocquet and Stock, 1957 in Crustacea. The name Coleocatiniidae Ponomarenko and Prokin, 2015 was created as a replacement name, but is unavailable as it was not based on an available genus group name at the time. In Kirejtshuk and Prokin (2018), Catiniidae was established as a synonym of Triaplidae Ponomarenko, 1977, but this synonymy is not supported by Ponomarenko (2021).

Genera
These six genera belong to the family Catiniidae:
 †Avocatinus Ponomarenko, 1969
 †Catinius Ponomarenko, 1968
 †Catinoides Ponomarenko, 1969
 †Macrocatinius Ponomarenko, 1969
 †Permocatinus Ponomarenko, 2021
 †Triassocatinius Ponomarenko, 1969

The genera Cervicatinius and Forticatinius were originally placed in this family by Tan and Ren (2007), but were moved to the superfamily Cleroidea in 2010.

References

†
Archostemata
Articles created by Qbugbot